Dunscaith Castle also known as Dun Scaich, Dun Sgathaich Castle and Tokavaig, is a ruined castle on the coast of the Isle of Skye, in the north-west of Scotland. Also called "Fortress of Shadows", it is the legendary home of the warrior maiden Scáthach, after whom it is named. It is protected as a scheduled monument.

History
The castle itself sits on an off-shore rock. This stone walled bridge then led onto a drawbridge, the pivot holes for which are still visible on the far side. Once on the other side of the drawbridge a door opened to a flight of stairs which was also sided by two walls. The flight of stairs led up to the castle.

Parts of the castle curtain wall still survive on the cliff edge but most of the inner buildings have gone. In the courtyard is a well and the remains of a stairway which once led up a tower.

Originally the castle belonged to the Clan MacDonald of Sleat, a branch of the Clan Donald or MacDonald. At some time in the 14th century it was taken from them by the Clan MacLeod and held briefly by the MacAskills, allies of the MacLeods but it was recaptured by the MacDonalds sometime in the 15th century.

In the 15th century the castle was again captured by King James IV of Scotland when the Chief of the Clan Donald, Lord of the Isles was broken by King James IV. The MacDonalds were allowed to keep possession of the castle. The MacDonalds abandoned the castle in the early 17th century, after which it slowly fell into ruin.

Legend
The castle is featured in the Ulster Cycle of Irish mythology as the place where Scáthach the Shadow, legendary Scottish warrior woman and martial arts teacher, trained the hero Cú Chulainn in the arts of combat. The Irish name for the fort, Dun Scathiag, is derived from hers.

See also
List of castles in Scotland

Notes

External links
Castle of Shadows, Scáthach
Dun Sgathaich Castle, Dark Isle
Lieutenants of the Coast, MacAskill.com
Dun Scaich, Royal Commission on the Ancient and Historical Monuments of Scotland
The Misty Isle, Sgathaich
The Red Branch, Timeless Myths
Dun of the Shadow, Clan Donald

Ruined castles in Highland (council area)
Clan Donald
Clan Macleod
Castles in the Isle of Skye
Scheduled Ancient Monuments in Highland